Giulio Manfredonia (born 3 November 1967 in Rome) is an Italian film director and screenwriter.

Biography
Manfredonia is the nephew of director Luigi Comencini. After working on several films as assistant director to Antonio Albanese, Luigi Comencini, and Cristina Comencini, Manfredonia made his debut as director in 2001 with the comedy Se fossi in te (If I Were You).
He followed this in 2004 with È già ieri (It's Already Yesterday), a remake of the 1993 American comedy Groundhog Day, with Antonio Albanese reprising Bill Murray's role. In 2008, he directed Si può fare.
In 2011, 2012, and 2019, he worked with Albanese again in the films Qualunquemente (Whatever), Tutto tutto niente niente (Everything Everything Nothing Nothing), and Cetto c'è, senzadubbiamente (It's Cetto, Without a Doubt) respectively.

Filmography
As assistant director
 La fame e la sete (1999)

As director
 È già ieri (2004)
 Tutto tutto niente niente (2012)
 Mafia and Red Tomatoes (2014)
 Non dirlo al mio capo (2016 - 12 episodes)
 Cetto c'è, senzadubbiamente (2019)

As director and screenwriter
 Se fossi in te (2001)
 Si può fare (2008)
 Qualunquemente (2011)

As screenwriter
 Tanti auguri (short film) (1998)
 Giornalisti (TV series) (2000)
 Di me cosa ne sai (2009)

Awards and recognition
 Nastro d'Argento - Best Short Film for Tanti auguri (1999)
 Venice Film Festival - EIUC Prize - with Giobbe Covatta (2005)
 David di Donatello (2009)
 David Youth Award for Si può fare
 Nominated for David di Donatello for Best Film for Si può fare
 Nominated for David di Donatello for Best Director for Si può fare
 Nominated for David di Donatello for Best Screenplay for Si può fare
 FICE Award for Si può fare (2009)
 Nastro d'Argento (2009)
 Best Theme for Si può fare
 Nominated for Best Comedy for Si può fare
 Golden Graal - Best Comedy Director for Si può fare
 Festival du cinéma italien de Bastia (2010)
 Special mention for Si può fare
 Nominated for Grand Jury Prize for Si può fare
 Nastro d'Argento (2011)
 Nominated for Best Comedy for Qualunquemente

References

External links
 

1967 births
Living people
Italian film directors
Italian screenwriters
Italian male screenwriters